The Fairey Long-range Monoplane was a British experimental aircraft first flown in 1928. It was single-engine, high-wing aircraft with fixed tail skid landing gear. Two examples were built (Monoplane I and Monoplane II).

Design and development
The aircraft was designed to meet Air Ministry Specification 33/27, issued by the Directorate of Technical Development (DTD) in December 1927 after the failure of three attempts by the RAF to break the absolute distance world record flying Hawker Horsley bombers. According to a Ministry spokesman in the House of Commons, this aircraft was to be constructed not just "for a specific record," but as a serious study into methods of increasing the range of aircraft. In order to soothe the anxieties of the Treasury, the aircraft started life as the Postal Aircraft. The pointed nose and sleek lines of the design gave rise to the nickname "Eversharp," after the American company producing mechanical pencils.

Although other configurations were studied, after wind tunnel testing a single high wing was chosen, allowing a gravity feed from the fuel tanks. The wing's spars were of wood with a steel pyramid system of internal bracing intended to add torsional rigidity and ensure that flight loads were evenly distributed between the spars irrespective of the position of the centre of pressure, and were fabric covered. The fuel capacity was 1,043 Imp gals (4,742 L). Fuel flowed by gravity to a small collector tank, from which it was pressure-fed to the engine by a mechanical fuel pump (if the mechanical pump failed, a wind-driven back-up pump could be extended into the windstream). To support long-range flight, there were two pilot-accessible parallel oil filter circuits, allowing one filter to be removed and cleaned with the other in operation. A bed aft of the wing allowed one pilot to sleep.

Operational history
Monoplane I, J9479, first flew on 14 November 1928 from RAF Northolt, with an RAF pilot. After correcting a few findings, Fairey transferred the aircraft to RAF operations on 7 December, and testing continued in preparation for the record attempt, including a 24-hour trial on 22–23 March 1929. Squadron Leader A. G. Jones-Williams and Flight Lieutenant N. H. Jenkins set off from RAF Cranwell, Lincolnshire on 24 April 1929. Slowed by headwinds, they turned from their destination to land at Karachi after 50:48 hours flight time. This time it was planned to fly from England to South Africa. This second attempt, with the same crew, departed on 16 December 1929, but crashed south of Tunis at 18:45, destroying the aircraft and killing the crew. Either the barometric pressure had dropped significantly between Tunisia and Cranwell, leading them to believe that their altitude was greater than it was, or the altimeter had malfunctioned.

Despite the setback, the Air Ministry ordered a second Long-range Monoplane (K1991) in July 1930, which flew on 30 June 1931. While similar to the first aircraft, it had a number of differences, including an enlarged and redesigned fin and rudder, greater redundancy in flight and navigational instrumentation, an autopilot (pneumatically powered, from an airstream-driven compressor), and lower-drag landing gear including wheel spats.

On 27–28 October 1931 Squadron Leader O. R. Gayford (the officer in charge of the RAF Long Range Development Unit) with Flight Lieutenant D. Betts as navigator flew K1991 from RAF Cranwell to Abu Seir in Egypt. The  flight was completed in 31½ hours.

From 6–8 February 1933, Gayford and his navigator Flight Lieutenant G. E. Nicholetts (FLt Betts had died in 1932, after complications from a medical procedure) flew non-stop in the second aircraft, K1991, from Cranwell to Walvis Bay, South West Africa. They then continued on to Cape Town. On their return to RAE Farnborough they were met by Air Minister (Lord Londonderry), Under Secretary for Air (Sir Philip Sassoon) and Sir John Salmond, Marshal of the Royal Air Force.

The distance record only stood for three months; it fell on 7 August 1933, reclaimed by the French with a Blériot 110. Gayford and the Long Range Development Unit would later make long-distance flights with the Vickers Wellesley.

After K1991 flew back to the United Kingdom a number of suggestions to re-engine the aircraft were made and the Air Ministry issued Specification 27/33 for it to be re-engined with a Junkers Jumo diesel engine. Updating work was started, but when it was decided to design a new aircraft instead, Monoplane II was scrapped after a few months in storage.

Operators

Royal Air Force

Specifications (Fairey Long-range Monoplane II)

See also

References

Notes

Bibliography

 Cooksley, Peter. "Long Range Fairey". Air Enthusiast, Fifty-one, August to October 1993.Stamford, UK:Key Publishing. ISSN 0143-5450. pp. 49–53.
 Meekcoms, K and Morgan, E. The British Aircraft Specification File. Tonbridge, Kent, England:Air-Britain Historians: 1994. 
 Taylor, H. A. "Record-breaker Extraordinary." Air International, Volume 13, No. 1, July 1977, pp. 18–24.
 Thetford, Owen. Aircraft of the Royal Air Force 1918–57. London:Putnam, 1957.
 Thetford, Owen. Aircraft of the Royal Air Force since 1918. London:Putnam: 1975. 
 Winchester, Jim. X-Planes and Prototypes. London: Amber Books Ltd., 2005. .

External links

1920s British experimental aircraft
Long-range Monoplane
High-wing aircraft
Single-engined tractor aircraft
Aircraft first flown in 1928